Molly Anne Bish (August 2, 1983 – June 27, 2000) was a sixteen-year-old American girl from rural Worcester County, Massachusetts, who disappeared while working as a lifeguard in her hometown of Warren, Massachusetts. Her remains were found three years later in neighboring Hampden County after what became the largest search in the state's history. Police believe Bish was the victim of a homicide and several suspects have been publicly identified, but the case remains officially unresolved as of 2023.

Disappearance
In the summer of 2000, 16-year-old Molly Bish began working as a lifeguard at Comins Pond in Warren, Massachusetts.  On June 26, the day before her disappearance, her mother, Magi, saw a mustached man in a white car parked in the lot of the beach where Bish's lifeguard post was located. Although he seemed suspicious at the time, she thought no further about him until after Bish's disappearance. 

On June 27, Magi drove her daughter to Comins Pond and dropped her off near the lifeguard station. Magi reportedly saw no sign of the stranger from the previous day or his white sedan. However, another witness reported that he saw a man matching the stranger's description in the pond's parking lot just minutes before Bish arrived. A local worker also reported that he saw a similar car parked at a cemetery connected to the pond by a path. Magi Bish was the last known person to see her daughter before her disappearance. Several hours later, police contacted Molly Bish's parents, informing them that no lifeguard had been on duty all day and that Bish's belongings had been left unattended at her station.

Body discovery
An extensive search was immediately launched. It was to become the largest and most expensive search for a missing person ever undertaken in Massachusetts. Her case was profiled on numerous American television shows, including Disappeared, America's Most Wanted, Unsolved Mysteries, and 48 Hours. A hunter had seen a blue bathing suit in the woods on Whiskey Hill in Palmer, in late fall 2002. In May 2003, he mentioned this to Tim McGuigan, who contacted police. An intense search of the area soon located Bish's body. On June 9, 2003, her body was found  from her family home. A cause of death was not determined, but investigators presume Bish was murdered and her remains buried.

Investigation 
In 2005, a Connecticut resident charged with attempted kidnapping in Connecticut was briefly under investigation in connection with the case.

In 2009, a new suspect was investigated. Rodney Stanger, a Florida resident convicted of murdering his girlfriend, had lived in Southbridge, Massachusetts – a few miles from the town of Warren – for more than 20 years. Stanger moved to Florida a year after the Bish murder. Following the murder of Crystal Morrison, Stanger's girlfriend of 20 years, Morrison's sister alerted the Massachusetts authorities. Stanger was known to have access to a white car similar to the one seen the day before Bish's disappearance. He was also known to fish in Comins Pond and hunt in the woods where Bish's body was found. In addition, Stanger closely matched the description provided by Magi Bish of the man seen in the white sedan the day before Molly Bish's disappearance.  Stanger has not been charged in her case.

In 2009, when Stanger was being investigated for the Bish murder, police also questioned him in connection with the 1993 murder of Holly Piirainen who went missing in Sturbridge. Bish and Piirainen were the same age in 1993, and Bish had written a letter of hope to Piirainen's parents in 1993. Stanger was not charged in this case. In 2012, forensic evidence led authorities to name David Pouliot — who died in 2003 — as a person of interest in the Piirainen case.

In November 2011, Gerald Battistoni, a.k.a. Confidential Informant #62 for the Eastern Hampden County Narcotic Task Force, was named as a suspect in Bish's death by private detective Dan Malley of Massachusetts. Battistoni served time in prison for repeatedly raping a teenage girl in the early 1990s. He attempted suicide in prison after newspaper articles identified him as a potential suspect in Bish and Piirainen's deaths. Battistoni, who had a criminal record dating back to 1980, had been in the area where Bish's body was found and resembles a composite sketch of the man Magi saw in the parking lot on the day before Bish disappeared.

After Gerald Battistoni was named as a suspect, Private Detective Dan Malley and the Bish family asked for DNA testing to be done. Massachusetts state police sent the DNA evidence to Texas. Gerald Battistoni died at Lemuel Shattuck Hospital in Jamaica Plain in November 2014.

There have been no arrests in the case , but Worcester County District Attorney Joseph Early announced a new person of interest on June 3, 2021, a registered sex offender who died in 2016. Francis P. Sumner Sr., a man with a more-than-20-page criminal record, is being considered in the case. Sumner was found dead inside his Spencer home on May 4, 2016.
Early did not say exactly how Sumner was connected to the case, but that investigators recently received new information that has led them to investigate him. On July 9, 1982, Sumner was convicted of aggravated rape and kidnapping from an attack the prior October inside an apartment that Sumner was trying to let. He was sentenced to concurrent sentences of 15-to-18 years on the rape charge and 9-to-10 years on the kidnapping charges. The earliest Sumner could have been released from Walpole State Prison was in 1997. It was not immediately clear how long Sumner was incarcerated for that case. Early said that Sumner was incarcerated several times during his life.

Legacy 
In 2004, Magi and John Bish founded The Molly Bish Center and Foundation in collaboration with Anna Maria College.

Connection to Holly Piirainen case 
Fellow Massachusetts resident Holly Piirainen was killed seven years earlier. Her body was also found in a wooded area in Hampden County. Police considered the possibility that the two cases could be related. Pouliot is considered a person of interest in both cases. It was discovered that Molly Bish had written a letter to Holly Piirainen's family following Holly's disappearance. This is an excerpt from Molly Bish's letter:

See also
 List of people who disappeared

References

External links
 Molly Bish at Find A Grave

2000s missing person cases
2000 in Massachusetts
2000s deaths
2000 murders in the United States
June 2000 events in the United States
June 2000 crimes
Missing person cases in Massachusetts
Unsolved murders in the United States
Deaths by person in Massachusetts
History of Worcester County, Massachusetts
Incidents of violence against girls